Doris Pearson (born Doris May Pearson, June 8, 1966) is an English singer and ex member of the pop group, Five Star.

Career
Doris Pearson, the eldest of the three Pearson sisters, was born in Brent, London. She was the choreographer of the group, teaching the other members of Five Star the dance routines to their hits. She, like the other members, sang backing vocals and wrote songs for Five Star albums.

Her first self-penned song, an uptempo pop track "Don't You Know I Love It", appeared as a b-side to their second UK Top 10 and biggest US Billboard Hot 100 hit, "Can't Wait Another Minute", and later popped up on their multi-million selling 1986 album, Silk And Steel. She also contributed to two consecutive albums, writing one song for each project with brother Delroy: "Knock Twice" from Between The Lines and "Someone's in Love" from Rock the World. The latter track was chosen as the lead single for the album in the US and was a top 40 hit on the Hot R&B Singles chart.

Her most notable input to a Five Star project came in 1990 when Doris took lead vocal for the first time on a UK single, "Treat Me Like a Lady" and again on its follow-up "Hot Love". Pearson also wrote and sang a third track "That's the Way I Like It", which followed the usual Five Star song format.

The final time Doris appeared as lead vocalist for Five Star was on the Heart and Soul project, released in 1995, for which she contributed another three tracks. "I Give, You Give", notably the most upbeat of the three, was released as a single in that year, and reissued in 1996 as a club remix. In 2001, she recorded the track "Get a Life Together" for the Five Star album Eclipse.

Musical projects outside of Five Star have included the 2017 song "Moving in the Shadows" and the 2021 track "Lover's Prayer", which saw her team up with musician Alex Asher Daniel.

References

External links

1966 births
Living people
20th-century Black British women singers
People from Romford
British contemporary R&B singers
Five Star members
English people of Jamaican descent